Abdul Mannan (born 2 July 1942) is a Bikalpa Dhara Bangladesh politician and the incumbent Jatiya Sangsad member representing the Laxmipur-4 constituency. He is the Chairman of Sunman Group.

Career
Mannan was elected to parliament from Dhaka-10 as a Bangladesh Nationalist Party candidate in 1991.

Mannan was elected to parliament from Dhaka-10 as a Bangladesh Nationalist Party candidate in the February 1996 Bangladeshi general election.

Mannan contested the parliamentary election from Dhaka-10 as a Bangladesh Nationalist Party candidate in the June 1996 Bangladeshi general election and lost. He received 63,631 votes.

Mannan was elected to parliament from Dhaka-10 as a Bangladesh Nationalist Party candidate in 2001. He received 94,995 votes.

 He resigned from Bangladesh Nationalist Party in 2005 and joined Bikalpa Dhara Bangladesh.

On 15 September 2006, Manans rally in Noakhali District was attacked.

Mannan was elected to parliament from Laxmipur-4 as a Bikalpa Dhara Bangladesh candidate on 30 December 2018. He received 183,906 votes. while his nearest rival, ASM Abdur Rob of Jatiya Samajtantrik Dal (Rab), received 40,993 votes.

References

Living people
1942 births
People from Lakshmipur District
Bangladesh Nationalist Party politicians
5th Jatiya Sangsad members
8th Jatiya Sangsad members
Bikalpa Dhara Bangladesh politicians
11th Jatiya Sangsad members
6th Jatiya Sangsad members